Switchflicker Records is an independent British record label based in Manchester, England. The company was established in 2000 by Jayne Compton.

Performers signed to the label include Divine David, Chloe Poems and formerly The Ting Tings, who launched their career at the label.

In 2008, members of The Ting Tings wrote critical comments on their blog about what they believe to be inflated prices charged by the label for their single, "That's Not My Name", asserting that the company was "cashing in" on the band's success at the expense of their fans.  The label responded in a published statement, noting that they were doing nothing wrong as they owned the stock and were selling remaining copies in line with the record's value at the time: 

Following this dispute, The Ting Tings signed with Columbia Records, having received assurances from Columbia that they would retain sufficient artistic control over their music.

References

British record labels